The Chamaesaura, also known as grass lizards, are a genus of legless lizards from southern and eastern Africa.  The limbs are reduced to small spikes. Chamaesaura propel themselves like snakes, pushing against contact points in the environment, such as rocks, plants and irregularities in the soil. They are viviparous and eat small invertebrates, especially grasshoppers.

Species 

Chamaesaura aenea  – coppery grass lizard, Transvaal snake lizard 
Chamaesaura anguina  – Cape grass lizard, Cape snake lizard 
Chamaesaura macrolepis  – large-scale grass lizard, large-scale snake lizard 
Chamaesaura miopropus  – Zambian snake lizard, Zambian grass lizard 
Chamaesaura tenuior  – Cape snake lizard

References 

Branch, B., 1998.  Field Guide to Snakes and other Reptiles of Southern Africa: Ralph Curtis Books Publishing, Sanibel Island, Florida, 399 p.
 Spawls, S., Howell, K, Drewes, R, and Ashe, J, 2002.  A Field Guide to the Reptiles of East Africa: Academic Press, San Diego, 543 p.

 
Lizard genera
Taxa named by Johann Gottlob Theaenus Schneider